Albany Beach is a sand beach located in Albany, California on the east shore of San Francisco Bay.

Situation

The beach is part of Albany Waterfront Park. It is located across from the Albany Bulb and Golden Gate Fields racetrack. It can be accessed by the Racetrack shuttle from North Berkeley BART station.

See also
List of beaches in California
List of California state parks

External links
City of Albany Waterfront & Bulb
East Bay Regional Parks

Albany, California
San Francisco Bay Area beaches
Beaches of Alameda County, California